Santeon  is a cooperative association of 7 top clinical hospitals across the Netherlands established in 2010:
Catharina Ziekenhuis
 Canisius-Wilhelmina Ziekenhuis (Nijmegen) 
Martini Ziekenhuis (Groningen), 
Medisch Spectrum Twente (Enschede and Oldenzaal),
 OLVG (Amsterdam)
 Maasstad Ziekenhuis (Rotterdam) 
 Sint Antonius Ziekenhuis (Nieuwegein).

These hospitals account for 11% of Dutch hospital care volume. They employ approximately 29,000 people, and generate €2.9 billion in annual revenues.

In 2018 it is said to have reduced unnecessary inpatient stays over 15 months by 30% and the rate of reoperation due to complications in breast cancer patients by 74% using structured, value-based health care working with the Boston Consulting Group.

References 

Teaching hospitals in the Netherlands